Constitutional reform in the Philippines, also known as charter change (colloquially cha-cha), refers to the political and legal processes needed to amend the current 1987 Constitution of the Philippines. Under the common interpretation of the Constitution, amendments can be proposed by one of three methods: a People's Initiative, a Constituent Assembly or a Constitutional Convention.

A fourth method, by both houses passing a joint concurrent resolution with a supermajority of at least 75%, has been proposed by House Speaker Feliciano Belmonte, Jr. who subsequently submitted to the House of Representatives "Resolution of Both Houses No. 1". This "simple legislation as the means to amend" would only require approval by both Houses voting separately. All proposed amendment methods must be ratified by a majority vote in a national referendum.

While no amendment to the 1987 Constitution has succeeded, there have been several high-profile attempts. None reached the ratification by referendum stage.

Methods of Charter Change

The Supreme Court ruled in 1997 that the People's Initiative method of amending the constitution is "fatally defective", or inoperable. Another ruling in 2006 on another attempt at a People's Initiative was ruled unconstitutional by the court  This only leaves the Constituent Assembly and the Constitutional Convention as the valid ways to amend the constitution.

Consultative Body
The President, through official proclamation or executive order, may create a consultative body that will study and propose amendments or revisions to the constitution. However, the draft of the consultative committee will only serve as a guide for the constitutional body that will propose amendments or revisions to the Constitution.

Proposed amendments or revision to the 1987 Constitution

Ramos administration 
The first attempt to amend the 1987 Constitution was under President Fidel Ramos. Among the proposed changes in the constitution included a shift to a parliamentary system and the lifting of term limits of public officials. Ramos argued that the changes will bring more accountability, continuity, and responsibility to the "gridlock"-prone Philippine version of presidential bicameral system. Some politically active religious groups, opposition politicians, business tycoons and left-wing organizations opposed the process that was supposed to lead to a national referendum. Critics argued that the proposed constitutional changes for one would benefit the incumbent, Ramos. On September 21, 1997, a church-organized rally brought in an estimated half a million people to Rizal Park.

Furthermore, on September 23, 1997, the advocates suffered a setback when the Supreme Court, under Chief Justice Andres Narvasa, narrowly dismissed a petition filed by the People's Initiative for Reform, Modernization and Action (PIRMA), which sought to amend the Constitution through a signature campaign or People's Initiative. The Supreme Court dismissed the petition on the grounds that the People's Initiative mode does not have enough enabling law for the proposed revisions or amendments in the 1987 constitution. Had the petition been successful, a national plebiscite would have been held for proposed changes.

Estrada administration 
Under President Joseph Estrada, there was a similar attempt to change the 1987 constitution. The process is termed as CONCORD or Constitutional Correction for Development. Unlike Constitutional Reform under Ramos and Arroyo the CONCORD proposal, according to its proponents, would amend only the restrictive economic provisions of the constitution that are considered to impede the entry of more foreign investments in the Philippines.

There were, once again, objections from opposition politicians, religious sects and left-wing organizations based on diverse arguments such as national patrimony and the proposed constitutional changes would be self-serving. Again, the government was accused of pushing constitutional reform for its own vested interests.

Arroyo administration 
During the term of President Gloria Macapagal Arroyo, multiple attempts were made to change the 1987 Constitution. Arroyo issued Executive Order No. 453 in August 2005 to create the Consultative Commission, headed by Dr. José Abueva. After holding consultations with different sectors of society, the commission proposed revisions to the 1987 constitution relating to a shift to a unicameral parliamentary form of government; economic liberalization; further decentralization of national government, and more empowerment of local governments through a transition to a parliamentary-federal government system. While constitutional reform and "opening up" of the Philippine economy were supported by the Philippine Chamber of Commerce and Industry and the Employers Confederation of the Philippines, these were opposed by the Makati Business Club.

Sigaw ng Bayan initiative 
Sigaw ng Bayan (Cry of the People), led by former Consultative Commission member Atty. Raul Lambino, and Union of Local Authorities of the Philippines campaigned in 2005–2006 for the amendments proposed by the Consultative Commission. Sigaw ng Bayan aimed to gather enough signatures to call for a plebiscite on the proposed constitutional changes by a People's Initiative.

Religious, business, and political groups, and coalitions such as One Voice, opposed the proposed amendments, citing untimeliness and contending that the incumbent President and her allies would directly benefit from the proposed changes by extending the President's term of office. The Communist Party of the Philippines (CPP) called the cha-cha process "anti-masses".

On October 25, 2006, the Supreme Court, under Chief Justice Artemio Panganiban, by a vote of 8–7, rejected Sigaw ng Bayan's initiative on two grounds:
 The initiative failed to comply with the basic requirements of the Constitution for conducting a people's initiative.
 The initiative proposed revisions and not amendments. Under the 1987 Constitution, a people's initiative cannot introduce constitutional revisions but only amendments. The Court held that changing the form of government, from presidential to parliamentary, or abolishing a house of Congress, such as the Senate, are revisions, which cannot be done by a people's initiative.

In November 2006, the Supreme Court denied with finality Sigaw ng Bayan's motions for reconsideration of the court's October 25, 2006, decision.

Constituent Assembly under De Venecia 

In December 2006, House Speaker Jose de Venecia, Jr. attempted to push for the constitutional change process by convening the House of Representatives of the Philippines and the Senate of the Philippines into a Constituent Assembly, or "con-ass," one of the three modes by which the 1987 Constitution could be amended.

Former President Joseph Estrada; left-wing organizations such as BAYAN; Brother Mike Velarde of El Shaddai; Brother Eddie Villanueva of Jesus is Lord Movement; Butch Valdes of Philippines LaRouche Youth Movement; Jose Maria Sison (who is currently in exile, now dead) of CPP and other groups and personalities called on their followers to go home that will culminate in a major "eating rally" on December 17, 2006. A few days before the planned rally, House Speaker De Venecia retreated on the constituent assembly (con-ass) mode to give way for constitutional reform via constitutional convention (con-con): the only mode of constitutional reform that many anti-constitutional reform groups said they will support. Speaker De Venecia "challenged" everyone to support his new proposal for the election of constitutional convention delegates to be held on the same day as the May 2007 local elections. Despite the concessions made by Speaker De Venecia, opponents ignored his new proposal and still pushed through with the rally of less than an estimated 15,000 protesters. In the "eating rally," the religious leaders called on the whole nation to embrace "electric post," "face removal," and "character change" instead of systematic changes such as constitutional reform.

Constituent Assembly under Nograles-Pimentel 
Monico O. Puentevella on May 7, 2008, filed House Concurrent Resolution No. 15, which supported Senate Resolution No. 10 backed by 16 senators. Unlike the Nene Pimentel Senate Resolution, Puentevella included the option of holding a constitutional convention but excluded a People's Initiative. Prospero Nograles, a self-proclaimed advocate of federalism, announced on May 1, 2008: "This federal system of government is close to my heart as a Mindanaoan leader and I'm sure most of the leaders in Mindanao will agree that we have long clamored for it. Senate Resolution 10 is a pleasant surprise because the Senate has a long history of opposing any move to amend the Constitution." The joint Senate resolution called for the creation of 11 federal states in the country by convening of Congress "into a constituent assembly for the purpose of revising the Constitution to establish a federal system of government."

Arroyo stated to visiting Swiss President Pascal Couchepin: "We advocate federalism as a way to ensure long-lasting peace in Mindanao." Press Secretary Jesus Dureza, on August 12, 2008, stated, "It's all systems go for Charter change. We are supporting Senate Joint Resolution No. 10. Naughty insinuations that she [Arroyo] was going for Cha-cha [Charter change] because she wants to extend her term in office prompted the President to make her position clear. She is calling for a constitutional amendment... in order to bring about the Bangsamoro Juridical Entity. An opportunity should be given to the whole country to avail of the reform effects of federalism. The sentiment of many people there is to give local officials more authority in order to perform better. And the federal set-up is the way forward to this. The President has approved the way forward and there's no question about it. If she has the political will to do it she has to muster political will in spite of all these noises."

Representative Victor Ortega of La Union, chairman of the House committee on constitutional amendments, said that his survey showed that 115 (94.26%) of the 123 solons were in favor of amending the Constitution. However, opposition and leftist lawmakers questioned the results and intent of Ortega's survey and called Arroyo's proposal a ploy for her "perpetuation in power" and the removal of protectionist provisions in the Charter. The survey showed 62 respondents favored constitutional reform by a constitutional assembly, and 89 respondents were in favor of shifting to a parliamentary form of government, compared to 56 who voted for federalism, and 70 respondents preferred to amend the Constitution after the 2010 presidential elections. Members of the committee on constitutional amendments would vote by the end August on whether to amend the Constitution. However, nothing came out from the proposal.

Aquino III administration

Belmonte's joint resolution on economic provisions 
Under President Benigno Aquino III several proposals were put forth by different members of Congress. Senate Resolution No. 10, by Senator Pimentel, called for constitutional reform to convert to a federal republic. Cagayan de Oro Representative Rufus Rodriguez and Abante Mindanao (ABAMIN) party-list Representative Maximo Rodriguez Jr. filed a bill pushing for a federal and parliamentary government, in addition to economic liberalization.

Speaker of the House, Feliciano Belmonte, Jr., filed Resolution of Both Houses No. 1, pushing for economic liberalization. The resolution would add five words to seven economic provisions in the Constitution: "unless otherwise provided by law." The seven provisions are Section 2, Art. XII on exploration, development, and utilization of natural resources; Section 3, Art. XII on alienable lands on the public domain; Section 7, Art. XII on conveyance of private lands; Section 10, Art. XII on reserved investments; Section 11, Art. XII on grant of franchises, certificates, or any other forms of authorization for the operation of public entity; Section 4 (2), Art. XIV on ownership of educational institutions; and Section 11 (1 and 2), Art. XVI on ownership and management of mass media and on the policy for engagement in the advertising industry. Supporting economic liberalism are business groups such as the Foundation for Economic Freedom, Arangkada Philippines, and the Makati Business Club. Governmental agencies like the Department of Foreign Affairs and the Department of Trade and Industry also are calling for economic liberalization. The resolution made it through two readings in the House of Representatives but did not have a third reading.

Duterte administration

During the May 2016 election, Rodrigo Duterte stated in May 2016 that a plebiscite on the proposed replacement of the unitary state with a federal one will be held in two years.

After winning, Duterte proposed to revive the proposed form of Nene Pimentel. On December 7, 2016, President Duterte signed Executive Order No. 10 creating a consultative committee (ConCom) to review the 1987 Constitution. Then on July 3, 2018, the ConCom unanimously approved the draft constitution through voting. It was submitted to the President on or before July 9 of the same year.

Referred to as the "Bayanihan Constitution" (referring to the Filipino value of communal work) by Duterte and the consultative committee, the proposed federal charter includes an amendment that aims to prohibit elected officials from switching political parties during the first and last two years of their term, as a response to turncoat behavior. Also included are provisions that seek to ban political dynasties, barring "persons related within the second civil degree of consanguinity or affinity" from running for public office "simultaneously for more than one national and one regional or local position."

Marcos Jr. administration 
Under the administration of President Bongbong Marcos, several legislators have put forward proposals to amend parts of the constitution. In the 19th Congress, members of the House of Representatives filed several proposals to amend the sections of the constitution regarding economic, political, and judiciary reforms. Meanwhile, in the Senate, several of its members rejected proposals to amend the constitution, with Senate President Migz Zubiri stating that it was "too controversial" as the administration was just starting.

Other key officials of the Marcos administration have also expressed support for charter change. Chief Presidential Legal Counsel Juan Ponce Enrile has proposed to scrap the current constitution and form a constitutional assembly. Meanwhile, National Security Adviser Clarita Carlos has pushed for a complete overhaul of the constitution and transition to a parliamentary government.

References

Bibliography
 The 1987 Constitution of the Republic of the Philippines 
 Article XVII, The 1987 Constitution of the Republic of the Philippines 
 Proposals/Recommendations of the Consultative Commission 
 Constitutional Correction for Development (CONCORD) 
 On Charter Change and the Common Good – CBCP DOCUMENTS 
 One Voice 
 Some Advantages Of Federalism And Parliamentary Government for the Philippines

Further reading

External links
 Group aiming to scrap Senate (in the United States) prepares petitions 
 PIA Charter Change News on the Philippine Information Agency 
 Why Change Our Presidential Government To Parliamentary Government? by José V. Abueva 
 Why Change Our Unitary Republic to the Federal Republic of the Philippines? by José V. Abueva 
Abs-Cbn Interactive, New people's initiative drive eyes revision, not amendment
Joint Senate Resolution No. 10: Federal System of Government
A repository of reference materials on the need for Constitutional Reform in the Philippines 
 The Constitution of the Republic of the Philippines (in Filipino and English Version)

Politics of the Philippines
Reform in the Philippines